Benjamin Brandreth (June 23, 1809 – February 18, 1880) was a pioneer in the early use of mass advertising to build consumer awareness of his product, a purgative that allegedly cured many ills by purging toxins out of the blood. He became a successful and wealthy businessman, bank president, and New York State Senator.

Biography

Brandreth was born in Newtown, Derbyshire, England, on 23 June 1809, the son of William Holmes (1775–1809) and Ann, née Brandreth (1785–1877). His father abandoned the family while Benjamin was young and he was raised by his mother and maternal grandfather William Brandreth, whose surname he adopted.

Brandreth's pills
Brandreth emigrated to the United States in 1835 with his three children shortly after the death of his second wife, Harriet Smallpage, hoping to find a bigger market than he had in England for his "Vegetable Universal Pill" invented by his grandfather, William Brandreth. The formula was a powerful cathartic and played off the popular notion that impurity of the blood was the source of many ills. Establishing himself on Hudson Street in New York City, Brandreth eventually found success marketing his pills prompting a move to a larger facility which he built in Sing Sing (later Ossining, New York) in 1838.

Brandreth was a pioneer in using the then-infant technique of mass advertising in building brand awareness to create a mass market for his product. Brandreth created and published a wide variety of advertising material for his pills, including a 224-page tome entitled The Doctrine of Purgation, Curiosities from Ancient and Modern Literature,  from Hippocrates and Other Medical Writers. His advertising copy had a distinctly literary flavor which found favor with the public. Brandreth widely distributed his books and pamphlets throughout the country as well as taking copious advertising space in newspapers. Eventually his pills became one of the best selling patent medicines in the United States. "…A congressional committee in 1849 reported that Brandreth was the nation's largest proprietary advertiser… Between 1862 and 1863 Brandreth's average annual gross income surpassed $600,000…" For fifty years Brandreth's name was a household word in the United States. Indeed, the Brandreth pills were so well known they received mention in Edgar Allan Poe's satirical story "Some Words with a Mummy", Herman Melville's classic Moby-Dick., and P. T. Barnum's book The Humbugs of the World.

The Brandreth Pill Factory complex was added to the National Register of Historic Places in 1980.

Although his pills sold well to the public, they were described by medical experts and skeptics as an example of quackery. Brandeth and his pills are mentioned in Dan King's book Quackery Unmasked (1858). Historian James Harvey Young has noted that Brandreth convinced "his dupes to swallow his pills as fast and as rapidly as they would their dinner" and deluded them with "the merest twaddle of medical language that ever made the ignorant gape, or the educated cry 'bah!'"

Other business interests
A prominent businessman, Brandreth was among the original founders and was the first President of the Westchester County Savings Bank in Tarrytown NY. The bank was incorporated on 21 July 1853 and was merged into Federal First Fidelity Bank on 30 December 1993. In 1857 he built the Brandreth Hotel near Canal and Broadway in New York City.

Brandreth Park
In 1851 Brandreth bought  in the Adirondacks of New York State for 15 cents an acre establishing the first private preserve in the Adirondack Park becoming known as "Brandreth Park". The Park remains in the family today and incorporates a number of cabins and cottages in a preserved wilderness setting.

Political activities
Brandreth was a prominent Democrat in Westchester County, New York and represented the district in the New York State Senate in 1850, 1851, 1858 and 1859.  In 1856 he narrowly lost election to the United States Congress to John W. Ferdon. He was active in a number of Democratic State conventions.

Civic
Brandreth was active in civic development in Sing Sing (later Ossining, New York). He was an early subscriber to the fundraising effort to build the Trinity Church in that town. He was one of the founders of the New York Eclectic Medical College, which he supported financially throughout his life. In 1874, he presented the building used by the College to Dr. Robert S. Newton and his associates. Brandreth was active in the Masons who took charge of his funeral with full honors.

Family
 
Brandreth was married three times; first to Susan Leeds from whom he was divorced a few months after the marriage. His second wife was Harriet Smallpage to whom he was married 7 years until her death, and third to Virginia Graham. He had 3 children with his second wife, among them George A. Brandreth, and 10 with his third. His children included Colonel Franklin Brandreth who was the father of the artist Courtenay Brandreth. He was also the grandfather of Fox Conner's wife Virginia Brandreth, and the great-great-great-grandfather of Gyles Brandreth.

Death
Brandreth died on 18 February 1880:

That morning he had risen early, reaching the plant, with his eldest son, at six-thirty. He had worked an hour or so in the mixing room. Then came a stroke of apoplexy and death. Thus, at the end as at the launching of his venture in America, Brandreth was mixing the purgative in which he so fervently believed.

The impact Brandreth had on the local community of Sing Sing was noted by the account in The New York Times which stated that at the time of his death
 
…flags have been hung at half-mast there and on Saturday all the business places of the village, including the bank, Post Office, Soldiers' monument, and several hotels, together with innumberable private dwellings, we draped in mourning.

Brandreth's funeral was held at the Trinity Church which could hold only a fraction of the mourners in attendance. Others lined the streets to the Dale Cemetery where he was buried. His body was in a wrought metal and bronze casket hermetically sealed with a full length plate glass top. The procession to the cemetery included carriages for the clergymen and pallbearers, the 16th Battalion brass band, the hearse with a bodyguard of 8 Masonic knights, and carriages for 150 friends and family, stretching out over a mile in length, so that the first carriages were arriving at the cemetery at about the same time as the last were leaving the church.

Allcock Manufacturing Company
Brandreth's pill company was known as The Brandreth Pill Works when he established operations in Ossining New York. In 1848 he bought Allcock's Porous Plaster from founder Thomas Allcock and the name of the firm eventually changed to Allcock Manufacturing. After Brandreth's death, control of the firm eventually moved to his great-grandson, Fox Brandreth Conner, who began manufacturing animal traps along with pills and plasters. After a pause in production for World War II, production of the traps resumed and the Havahart brand became a registered trademark. Conner sold the pill and plaster business in the 1960s thus ending Brandreth's medical legacy, but continued making the Havahart traps. In 1979 the Havahart trap business was sold to the Woodstream Corporation of Lititz, Pennsylvania, and the remaining property in Ossining was sold to Filex Steel Products Company. The remaining 34 employees in Ossining were offered jobs in Pennsylvania with the new owner, but many retired, thus ending the 142-year legacy of Brandreth's enterprise.

References

1809 births
1880 deaths
19th-century American politicians
Democratic Party New York (state) state senators
Patent medicine businesspeople
People from Ossining, New York
People from New Mills